Claremont High School was a government  co-educational comprehensive secondary school located in , a northern suburb of Hobart, Tasmania, Australia. Established in 1961 on the site of Windemere House, the school catered for students from Years 7 to 10 and was the main high school for the Claremont area.

In 2011 Claremont High School merged with Rosetta High School to from Montrose Bay High School.

See also
 List of schools in Tasmania
 Education in Tasmania

References 

High schools in Tasmania
Defunct schools in Tasmania
Educational institutions established in 1961
1961 establishments in Australia
2011 disestablishments in Australia
Educational institutions disestablished in 2011